Defending champion Shingo Kunieda and his partner Nicolas Peifer defeated Robin Ammerlaan and Stefan Olsson in the final, 6–2, 6–3 to win the men's doubles wheelchair tennis title at the 2011 French Open.

Stéphane Houdet and Kunieda were the defending champions, but did not participate together. Houdet partnered Michael Jeremiasz, but was defeated by Kunieda and Peifer in the semifinals.

Seeds
 Shingo Kunieda /  Nicolas Peifer (champions)
 Maikel Scheffers /  Ronald Vink (semifinals)

Draw

Finals

References
Main Draw

Wheelchair Men's Doubles
French Open, 2011 Men's Doubles